Buchner is a German surname. Notable people with this surname include the following:

 Andreas Buchner (1776–1854), German historian
 Annemarie Buchner (1924-2014), German Olympian
 August Buchner (1591–1661), German influential Baroque poet
 Eduard Buchner (1860–1917), German chemist and zymologist
 Edward Franklin Buchner (1868–1929), American psychologist
 Ernst Buchner (curator) (1892–1962), German museum administrator
 Hans Buchner (1483–1538, German organist and composer
 Hans Ernst August Buchner (1850–1902), German bacteriologist
 Johann Andreas Buchner (1783–1852), German pharmacologist 
 Ludwig Andreas Buchner (1813–1897), German pharmacologist
 Paul Buchner (1531–1607), German architect, geometer, carpenter, and screw maker

See also
 Büchner

German-language surnames